Dzmitry Balashow (born 8 January 1974) is a retired Belarusian professional footballer. After retiring, he worked as a car mechanic.

Honours
Belshina Bobruisk
Belarusian Premier League champion: 2001
Belarusian Cup winner: 1996–97, 2000–01

References

External links
 
 

1974 births
Living people
Belarusian footballers
Belarusian expatriate footballers
Belarus international footballers
FC Shakhtyor Soligorsk players
FC Arsenal Tula players
Expatriate footballers in Russia
FC Torpedo Minsk players
FC Kommunalnik Slonim players
FC Belshina Bobruisk players
FC Khimik Svetlogorsk players
FC Baranovichi players
FC Dnepr Rogachev players
FC Lida players
FC Osipovichi players
Association football forwards